Laemodonta exaratoides is a species of small air-breathing, snails, terrestrial pulmonate gastropod mollusks in the family Ellobiidae.

Distribution 
This species occurs in Japan (Honshū, Kyūshū and Shikoku) and it is Near Threatened species in Japan.

References

Ellobiidae
Gastropods described in 1957